At the 1952 Winter Olympics in Oslo, Norway, the six alpine skiing events were held from Thursday, 14 February, to Wednesday, 20 February. The downhill and giant slalom events were held at Norefjell in Krødsherad, Buskerud, and the slalom events at Rødkleiva in Oslo.

The giant slalom made its Olympic debut, and the combined event was dropped as an Olympic medal event for four decades, until 1988.  It returned as a medal event at the World Championships two years later in 1954, and for the concurrent World Championships in Olympic years from 1956 through 1980. For fourteen World Championships (1954–1980), the combined was a "paper race," using the results from the three events (and required the completion of each).

Medal summary

Men's events

Women's events

Medal table

Course information

Source:

Participating nations
Twenty-eight nations sent alpine skiers to compete in the events in Oslo.

References

External links
International Olympic Committee results database
FIS-Ski.com – results – 1952 Winter Olympics – Oslo, Norway
FIS-Ski.com – results – 1952 World Championships – Oslo, Norway

 
1952 Winter Olympics events
Alpine skiing at the Winter Olympics
1952 in alpine skiing
Alpine skiing competitions in Norway